Mall Nukke (born December 6, 1964) is an Estonian artist. A printmaker by training, she is primarily known for her paintings, collages and installations influenced by pop art.  Mall Nukke emerged on the Estonian art scene in the early 1990s, her work at the period can be seen as commentary of nascent mass culture and consumer society in newly independent Estonia.  Her early collages combined various cultural references and created new media characters based on real entertainers and public figures. Since the 2000s, Mall Nukke has concentrated on creating photo-manipulations and mixed media paintings inspired by Eastern Orthodox icon art.

Life and education
Mall Nukke was born on December 6, 1964, in Tallinn (Estonia). She went to Children's Art School in Tallinn from 1977 to 1979, Kopli Art School, also in Tallinn, between 1981 and 1983, meanwhile attending Kivihall School of Calligraphic Art (Tallinn, from 1982 to 1983). From 1985 Mall Nukke studied at the Estonian Academy of Arts, graduating from the Department of Graphic Fine Arts in 1992 as MA. She teaches drawing at the Sally Stuudio since 1994. She is a member of the Association of Estonian Printmakers, and of the Estonian Artists' Association since 1992, member of the Estonian Painters' Association since 2009. A short documentary 
"Mall Nukke", was shot in 1998 by Estonian Television.

Works

Works in collections
Artworks by Mall Nukke can be found at KUMU, Tartu Art Museum, OÜ Sadolin's art collection (Estonia), Rauma City Museum (Finland), Viinistu Art Museum (Estonia), Vexi Salmi art collection (Finland), Nef Gallery (Kyiv, Ukraine).

Exhibitions
Mall Nukke's art has been exhibited widely both in Estonia and abroad.

Solo exhibitions (selection)

2011 "Urban Mystic 2" Tartu Art Hall Little Gallery, Estonia
2011 "Urban Mystic" Hobusepea Gallery, Tallinn, Estonia
2010 "Money Faces 2" Gallery of Parliament of Estonia, Tallinn
2010 "Money Faces" Haus Gallery, Tallinn, Estonia
2009 "Collages 1993– 2009" Artdepoo Gallery, Estonia
2008 "Rotation" Gallery 008, Tallinn, Estonia
2007 "Possibilities II" Artdepoo Gallery, Estonia
2006 "Possibilities" Pärnu City Gallery, Estonia
2005 "Urban III" Pärnu Theatre Gallery, Pärnu, Estonia

2004 "Icons" Chapelle Saint-Anne, Saint-Pair-sur-Mer, France
2004 "Icon" Estonian Embassy in Vilnius, Lithuania
2004 "Icon 2004" Haus Gallery, Tallinn, Estonia
2004 "Urbans II" Estonian Art Academy gallery, Tallinn, Estonia
2003 "Urbans" Pärnu Theatre Gallery, Pärnu, Estonia

2003 "Estonian Gold" SEB Bank Gallery, Tallinn, Estonia
2003 "Modern Icon" Baroti Gallery, Klaipeda, Lithuania
2003 "Map Tricks" Estonian Embassy gallery in Helsinki Gallery, Finland
2002 "Modern Icon" Lawra Gallery, Kyiv, Ukraine
2002 "Human & Relicts" Turtle Gallery, Viljandi, Estonia
2002 "Return to Parnassos" Haapsalu Town Gallery, Haapsalu, Estonia
2002 "20 IKOONI 02" Gallery of Parliament of Estonia, Tallinn
2002 "24 Iconical Moments", Estonian Art Academy Gallery, Tallinn
2001 "Modern Icons" ZDH, Moscow, Russia
2001 "Icons 2001" Estonian Embassy in Riga, Latvia
2000 "Estonian Egos" City Gallery, Tallinn, Estonia
2000 "Icons 2000" Sammas Gallery, Tallinn, Estonia
1998 "Playtime" Vaal Gallery, Tallinn, Estonia
1995 "Idols III" Gallery of Tallinn Art Hall, Tallinn, Estonia
1994 "Idols II" Sammas Gallery, Tallinn, Estonia
1994 "Drawings" Hannelore Greve Gallery, Hamburg, Germany
1993 "Idols I" Vaal Gallery, Tallinn, Estonia
1992 "Abstract Landscapes" Suomi Gallery, Stockholm, Sweden

Group exhibitions (selection)
2012 "Painters' Association Annual exhibition" Pärnu Contemporary Art Museum, Estonia
2011 "Artist and City" ZDH, Moscow, Russia
2011 "Abstract" EAA 11. Annual Exhibition, Tallinn Art Hall, Estonia
2011 "What Can You Do With White Color?" Vaal Gallery, Tallinn, Estonia
2011 "Golden City" Pärnu Contemporary Art Museum, Estonia
2010 "Convert!" Rotermann's Salt Storage, Tallinn, Estonia
2010 "Estonia in Berlin/Brandenburg" Kunstverein Brieselang Gallery, Germany
2010 "Printed Matter from Estonia" Expo 2010, Shanghai, China
2010 "Confrontations" EAA 10. Annual Exhibition, Tallinn Art Hall, Estonia
2010 "The Last Painting" Tartu Art Hall, Estonia
2010 "Blue" Pärnu's Contemporary Art Museum, Estonia
2009 "Wir aus Estland" Gallery Melnikov, Heidelberg, Germany
2009 "Self-exposure" EAA Annual Exhibition, Tallinn Art Hall, Estonia
2009 "Manu Propia" International Drawing Biennale, Gallery Atrium, Tallinn, Estonia
2009 "Haus-party" Haus Gallery, Tallinn, Estonia
2008 "Estonian Printmaking" Riga Museum of Foreign Art, Latvia
2008 "Art Summer" Viinistu Art Museum, Estonia
2008 "Vabaduse Square" Tallinn Art Hall, Estonia
2007 Tokyo International Screen Print Biennale, Japan
2007 "Impact V" International Graphic Exhibition, Rotermann Salt Storage, Estonia
2007 "The Best Selection" Tartu Art Hall, Estonia
2007 "Estonian Landscape" Tartu Snail Tower, Estonia
2007 "The Art of Living" Tallinn Art Hall, Estonia
2006 "Collected Crises" KUMU, Estonia
2006 "Tehnobia" Art Hall, Tallinn, Estonia
2005 "Now Art Now Future" Klaipeda, Lithuania
2005 "VII Biennale of graphics of the Baltic Countries" Kaliningrad, Russia
2005 "Identidiies" Tallinn Art Hall, Estonia
2004 "I & Other" Tallinn Art Hall, Estonia
2003 "Depending/Dependness" Tallinn Art Hall, Estonia
2002 "ZDH Gallery Fair" Dom Hudozhnikov, Moscow, Russia
2002 "100 Portraits" Heidelberg Castle, Germany
2002 "Gotland Art Summer" Roma Gallery, Gotland, Sweden
2002 "Four Artists/ Drawings" Estonian Art Academy Gallery, Tallinn
2001 "Sidestep" Pärnu City Gallery, Estonia
2001 "The Manning" Rotermann's Salt Storage, Tallinn, Estonia
2000 "Artist and God" Tallinn Art Hall, Estonia
2000 "The naturalism" Gallery of Tallinn Art Hall, Estonia
1999 "M.O.O.D." Rotermann's Salt Storage, Tallinn, Estonia
1998 Tallinn's XI Graphic Triennale, Rotermann's Salt Storage, Tallinn, Estonia
1998 "Electrokardiogramm" Rotermann's Salt Storage, Tallinn, Estonia
1997 "Water. Color" Rotermann's Salt Storage, Tallinn, Estonia
1996 "Estonia as Sign" 4. Sorose KKK Annual Exhibition, Tallinn Art Hall, Estonia
1996 "Sweet Home" ArtGenda. Øksnehallen, Copenhagen, Denmark
1995 "Estonian Printmaking" Stadsgalerie. Gouda, Netherlands
1994 "14th International Triennial of Small Prints" Taller Galereia Fort. Cadaque, Spain
1994 "3rd International Triennial of Small Prints" Chamalières, France
1993 "3rd Triennial of Small Prints" Riga, Latvia
1993 "7th International Varna Printmaking Biennial" Bulgaria
1993 "Estonian Art" Länsi-Keskus, Helsinki, Finland
1991 "Printmaking Gallery Studio" Rauma Art Museum, Rauma, Finland
1990 "Printmaking Gallery Studio" Estonian House, New York, United States

Monumental works
2010 St. Patric's pub (Vana-Posti St. in Tallinn, Estonia) panels
2006 St. Patric's pub ("Foorum", Narva Rd. 7 in Tallinn, Estonia) panneau "Ingel I-III"
2005 St. Patric's pub (Karja St. In Tallinn, Estonia) panneau
1997 "Hollywood II" mural painting in Club Hollywood, Tallinn, Estonia
1996 "Hollywood I" mural painting in Club Hollywood, Tallinn, Estonia

Bibliography

In books
"Lühike eesti kunsti ajalugu" S.Helme, J.Kangilaski 1999 
"Eesti kunstnikud/Artists of Estonia 2" J.Saar, 2000
"Ülbed üheksakümnendad/The Nosy Nineties" S. Helme, J. Saar 2001

Inclusion in catalogues
Foyer-Galerie des Opernhauses Halle 1993 
"Estnische Graphik" Hallescher Kunstverein E.V. 1993 
International Print Biennale Varna 1993 
Troisieme Triennale Mondiale D'Estampes Petit Format Chamalieres Auvergne France. 1994 
15è Mini Print Internacional de Cadaqués 1995 
Estfem. Eesti feministiiku kunsti näitus, Vaal Galerii, Linnagalerii, Mustpeade Galerii. Tallinn, 1995 
Xth Vilnius Painting Triennial 1996. The Contemporary Art Center of Vilnius 
Artgenda 96. Copenhagen 96, cultural capital of Europe. 
"IIllustratiors Handwrites '96", Valik Eesti disainerite, graafikute ja illustraatorite käekirju. Muldia, 1996 
"Estonia as Sign" The Contemporary Art Center of Soros' 4. Annual Exhibition 1996 
"Color of Art" ES Sadolin AS 2002 
Tallinn XI Print Triennal, 1998 
"Shape and Form" Tallinn, 2000 
"The Nosy Nineties" S. Helme, J. Saar 2001 
"Sotheby's International Young Art" Tel Aviv 2001 
"ZDH 2002" Moscow 2002 
"Quard l'Art' Change la Baie" Normandie 2004 
"VII Baltic Graphic Triennale" Kaliningrad 2005 
"Now Art Now Future" Kaunas 2005 
6th Annual Exhibition of Estonian Artist Association. Tehnobia. 2006 
"Art Annual Book" Pärnu 2006 
"The Meanful City" Tartu 2006 
"Estonian Landscape" Tartu 2007 
"Tokyo Screen Print Biennale" Tokyo 2007 
Estonian Artists Association Annual Exhibition "Vabaduse Square" Tallinn 2008 
"The cataloque of Estonian Lithographic Portfolio II" Tallinn 2008 
"Mall Nukke. Collages" Tallinn 2009 
"Confrontations. EAA 10. Annual Exhibition" Tallinn 2010 
"Abstract. EAA 11. Annual Exhibition" Tallinn 2011

Articles in newspapers (selection)
Kaire Nurk, "Kollaaži kood". Sirp, 01.12. 2012 [1] 
Andri Ksenofontov, "Mall Nukke linnamüstika". Sirp, 28.01. 2011 [2] 
Andri Ksenofontov, "Euro küüned krooni näos". Sirp, 17.09. 2010 [3]

References

External links

1964 births
Living people
Artists from Tallinn
20th-century Estonian painters
21st-century Estonian painters
Estonian women painters
20th-century Estonian women artists
21st-century Estonian women artists